Elizabeth Berg may refer to:

 Elizabeth Berg (author) (born 1948), American author
 Z Berg (Elizabeth Berg, born 1986), American musician

See also
Berg (surname)